LDRSHIP is an acronym for the seven basic values of the United States Army:

 Loyalty - bear true faith and allegiance to the U.S. Constitution, the Army, your unit and other soldiers.
 Duty - Fulfill your obligations.
 Respect - Treat people as they should be treated.
 Selfless Service -  Put the welfare of the nation, the Army, and your subordinates before your own.
 Honor - Live up to all the Army values. 
 Integrity - Do what’s right, legally and morally.
 Personal Courage - Face fear, danger or adversity (physical or moral).

See also
Leadership
United States Army
U.S. Soldier's Creed

References

External links
Army Values
FM 1, The Army (14 June 2005)

United States Army traditions